Kya Khat Hmyaung is a village in Ma Gyi La Har Village Tract in Yegyi Township in the Pathein District of the Ayeyarwady Region in Myanmar.

References 
 https://archive.today/20140621044415/http://media.web-myanmar.com/location/kya_khat_hmyaung-mm0701064905_8.html

Populated places in Ayeyarwady Region